Sphenella setosa is a species of tephritid or fruit flies in the genus Sphenella of the family Tephritidae.

Distribution
Saudi Arabia.

References

Tephritinae
Insects described in 2005
Diptera of Asia